Washington Shirley may refer to:

 Washington Shirley, 2nd Earl Ferrers (1677–1729), British peer
 Washington Shirley, 5th Earl Ferrers (1722–1778), British admiral and astronomer
 Washington Shirley, 8th Earl Ferrers (1760–1842), British peer
 Washington Shirley, 9th Earl Ferrers (1822–1859), British peer

See also
Shirley Washington